The Liberal Party (Liberalna partiya, LP) was a political party in Bulgaria and the main force in domestic politics between independence in 1878 and the mid-1880s when it dissolved into several different factions.

History
The party was established after the Constituent Assembly elections in January 1879 by Petko Karavelov, Petko Slaveykov and Dragan Tsankov. In the parliamentary elections in September and October of that year the party won 140 of the 170 seats in the National Assembly. The elections the following year saw the Liberal Party maintain its majority in the Assembly, winning 103 of the 162 seats. The 1884 elections saw it win 100 of the 171 seats.

During the mid-late 1880s the party gradually dissolved, with several new parties later established by its former members, including the Progressive Liberal Party (1884), the People's Liberal Party (1886) and the Radoslavist Liberal Party (1887). The Liberal Party was briefly resurrected in the 1890s, winning three seats in the 1894 elections, before becoming the Democratic Party in 1896.

References

Defunct political parties in Bulgaria
Political parties established in 1879
Political parties disestablished in 1896
1879 establishments in Bulgaria